Hopwood DePree (born February 1970) is an American actor, author, comedian, filmmaker, entrepreneur and philanthropist.

After learning about the ancestral home of the Hopwood family of Hopwood Hall at Middleton, Greater Manchester, England, he moved from Hollywood to renovate and restore the dilapidated 600-year-old hall.

Early life
DePree was born and grew up in Holland, Michigan, the son of Thomas DePree and Deanna, daughter of Herbert Hopwood Black (1911-2008), who was recruited to Michigan as a mechanical engineer in the early years of General Motors. Black had been raised near Hopwood, PA and claimed descent from American Revolutionary War-era civil servant John Hopwood. DePree's father was a politician (Republican), political advisor and the founder of a local insurance company.

After graduating from Holland High School, DePree moved to Los Angeles where he attended the University of Southern California. He won his first paying role (Rhinoskin: The Making of a Movie Star) when a casting director (Mali Finn) saw him in a USC play. Growing up, DePree did not like his unusual first name and chose to use the name Todd. It was only when he became an actor that he reverted to his birth name.

Career
After his performance in The Last Big Attraction, director Whit Stillman introduced him to a producer who got DePree a deal with Warner Bros. to create, executive produce and star in his own TV show.

After a visit home to Michigan, DePree saw an opportunity to give back to the community that he grew up in. He decided to convert an old, abandoned whip-cream factory into several sound stages and hire unemployed auto and manufacturing workers as crew members. That factory eventually became Tictock Studios which has developed a training program, targeted at below-the-line workers, to get new crew members ready for work. DePree was able to recruit Jeffrey Stott, a veteran Hollywood movie producer (Executive Vice President of Castle Rock Entertainment between 1988 and 2002), to help teach the training classes.

DePree was appointed by Governor Jennifer M. Granholm to the Michigan Film Office Advisory Council to represent broad areas of film and motion picture making, production of television programs, and commercials, and related industries in Michigan.

Hopwood Hall
 
DePree has stated in interviews that when he was a boy his grandfather used to tell him bedtime stories about Hopwood Hall but he always assumed it was a fairy tale. Decades later he discovered Hopwood Hall to be a real place, and still standing. The name Hopwood dates back to 1100 A.D. in Middleton outside Manchester, England; Hopwood Hall was built in the 15th century, owned by the Hopwood family, passing to the Gregge (later Gregge-Hopwood, later Hopwood) family on the death of the last member of the Hopwood family resident there. DePree was featured in the news when he moved from Hollywood to England to fulfill his dream of restoring the hall. He has an agreement with the local council to be the new guardian of the vacant and dilapidated Hopwood Hall. He is renovating the building and has received funding to help with costs. He hopes to turn it into a community arts center.

In 2017, DePree began chronicling the renovation process of Hopwood Hall Estate with videos on his YouTube channel.

In 2019, DePree performed a multimedia stand-up comedy show called The Yank is a Manc! My Ancestors and Me which he toured in Brighton, Manchester, London and England.

In September 2020, it was announced that DePree secured a global publishing deal with William Morrow, an imprint of HarperCollins, and a six-figure advance for his memoir Finding Hopwood, which was developed from his comedy show.

DePree's memoir,Downton Shabby: One American's Ultimate DIY Adventure Restoring His Family's English Castle, was published in 2022.

In March 2021, it was announced that EQ Media Group will be producing an unscripted TV series called Hopwood’s Castle. 

In November 2021, with DePree as chair of the Hopwood Foundation charity, the restoration project was given a grant totalling £460,000: £368,294 by Historic England on behalf of the Department for Digital, Culture, Media and Sport as part of the Culture Recovery Fund, supplemented by £92,073 by Rochdale Borough Council. Focus was stated to be on repair works particularly around the roof, and provision of training and resources for volunteers.

Filmography 
Film

In 1995, DePree produced, directed, wrote and starred in Rhinoskin: The Making of a Movie Star, a "mockumentary" about the struggle of young actors seeking work in Hollywood. The film received a limited U.S. theatrical release and was bought by the Sundance Channel after screening at 17 international film festivals. At the age of 23, DePree was globe-trotting to promote his film. "Good Morning America" called it "wickedly funny." The Los Angeles Times declared it "amazing."

He produced, directed, wrote, and starred in The Last Big Attraction in 1999, which received a nomination at the Hamptons International Film Festival and won three awards at the Newport International Film Festival. DePree was one of the producers of the 2010 film Virginia, directed and written by Academy Award winner Dustin Lance Black and starring Academy Award winner Jennifer Connelly and four time Academy Award nominee Ed Harris. DePree and Rebecca Green were the executive producers of the 2010 independent film Tug, written and directed by Abram Makowka.

Television

One of his first roles was the defendant in a 1993 episode of Doogie Howser, M.D. and he played Paul Watkins in the 2004 CBS TV movie Helter Skelter, which was nominated for a primetime Emmy.

Philanthropy 
In 2012, DePree was honored by ArtServe at the 50th Annual Michigan Youth Arts Festival with an Inspiration Award for his contributions to students.

Additionally, he co-founded and hosts the annual Waterfront Film Festival held in the beach resort area of West Michigan. The festival is a non-profit organization whose goal is to provide a "middle coast" venue for independent filmmakers eager to show their work to sophisticated audiences. It is supported in-part by a grant from the National Endowment for the Arts and was named as a top "Ten Fantastic Film Festival Vacation" by FilmThreat.com, and ranked in the "Top 5 Film Festivals" by SAG Indie in the Screen Actors Guild magazine.

In early 2015 FOX news announced DePree was partnering with ArtPrize to launch ArtPrize OnScreen.  ArtPrize is a privately funded non-profit organization that gives away the world's largest cash prizes (over $500,000 annually) to competing artists.  September 2015 and was the first year for feature, short and documentary films to be added into the competition overseen by Hopwood.  Several films won cash prizes and the documentary "T-Rex" advanced into the final round for the $200,000 Jury Prize.

In 2019, UK's Heritage Trust Network invited DePree to join their Board of Trustees and he accepted.

Politics 
Beginning in 2006, DePree worked closely in Michigan with the House of Representatives and Senate to craft a tax-based incentive program that would help bring the film industry to his home state. He was called upon numerous times to testify for the Senate before the bill eventually passed almost unanimously in late 2007 and signed into law in April 2008. Shortly thereafter, Governor Jennifer M. Granholm appointed him as an Advisor to continue to help bring the film industry to the state of Michigan.

Subsequently, the film industry in Michigan went from under 2 million dollars in film production annually to hundreds of millions in expenditures by productions in Michigan in less than two years.

References

External links
 
 

American male film actors
American film directors
American film producers
American male screenwriters
Living people
Male actors from Michigan
1970 births
American people of English descent